Paul Bradley (born June 13, 1983) is a retired American mixed martial artist who competed mostly in the Welterweight division. A professional competitor since 2006, Bradley has also fought in the Bellator MMA, UFC, Strikeforce, Shark Fights, King of the Cage, and was a contestant on The Ultimate Fighter: Team Rampage vs. Team Forrest.

Background
Born and raised in Tama, Iowa, Bradley competed in wrestling at South Tama High School where he was a state champion in his senior season, in addition to runner-up finishes as a junior and sophomore. Bradley was also a Cadet National Champion as a freshman, and earned in two letters in football as well as one in baseball. In football, Bradley won All-Conference honors as a senior and compiled an overall record in wrestling of 168-18 before continuing his career at the University of Iowa. At Iowa, Bradley was a two-time All-American and finished as high as fourth at the NCAA Championships. After graduating, Bradley coached wrestling at the University of Buffalo and Indiana University before transitioning into mixed martial arts.

Mixed martial arts career

Early career
Bradley started his career in 2006. He fought mainly for Indiana's promotion Legends of Fighting Championship. In March 2008, Bradley was announced as a cast member of The Ultimate Fighter.

The Ultimate Fighter
Bradley was a contestant in The Ultimate Fighter: Team Rampage vs. Team Forrest. He defeated Reggie Orr during the entry via unanimous decision.

He was picked to be a member of Team Rampage, but had to leave the house due to a skin condition, which could possibly be transmitted to the other fighters.

Strikeforce
Bradley made his debut against Levi Avera on September 25, 2009 at Strikeforce Challengers: Kennedy vs. Cummings. He won via unanimous decision.

Bradley faced Luke Rockhold on February 26, 2010 at Strikeforce Challengers: Kaufman vs. Hashi. He lost via TKO in the first round.

Ultimate Fighting Championship
Bradley made his debut on short notice against Rafael Natal on August 6, 2011 at UFC 133. He lost via unanimous decision.

Bradley had a rematch against Mike Pierce on November 12, 2011 at UFC on Fox: Velasquez vs. dos Santos. He lost via split decision and was subsequently released from the promotion.

Bellator MMA
Bradley made his promotional debut against Karl Amoussou on October 18, 2013 at Bellator 104. He won the fight via unanimous decision.

In March 2014, he entered into the Bellator Season 10 Welterweight Tournament. He faced Nathan Coy in the opening round on March 14, 2014 at Bellator 112 and lost the fight via unanimous decision.

Bradley faced Josh Neer in the main event at Bellator 129 on October 17, 2014. He won the fight by unanimous decision.

Bradley faced Chris Honeycutt at Bellator 140 on July 17, 2015. The fight ended midway through the second round after an accidental clash of heads between the two fighters, resulting in a cut on Bradley that the doctor deemed too bad to allow the fighter to continue.  The official result was a No Contest.  A rematch with Honeycutt was held on January 29, 2016 at Bellator 148.  Despite again being the betting underdog, Bradley won the bout via TKO early in the first round.

Championships and accomplishments

Amateur wrestling
National Collegiate Athletic Association
NCAA Division I All-American out of University of Iowa (2003–04)
NCAA Division I 184 lb: Fourth place out of University of Iowa (2003)
NCAA Division I 184 lb: Fifth place out of University of Iowa (2004)
Big Ten Conference 184 lb: Runner-up out of University of Iowa (2003)
Big Ten Conference 184 lb: Fourth place out of University of Iowa (2004)
Big Ten Conference 184 lb: Seventh place out of University of Iowa (2005)

Mixed martial arts
Ring of Combat
ROC Middleweight Championship (One time)

Mixed martial arts record

|-
|Loss
|align=center| 23–10 (2)
|Handesson Ferreira
|TKO (punches)
|PFL 7
|
|align=center|1
|align=center|0:20
|Atlantic City, New Jersey, United States
|
|-
|Loss
|align=center| 23–9 (2)
|João Zeferino
|TKO (punches)
|PFL 3
|
|align=center|1
|align=center|1:58
|Washington, DC, United States
|
|-
|Loss
|align=center| 23–8 (2)
|Alexander Shlemenko
|Decision (unanimous)
|M-1 Challenge 75 - Shlemenko vs. Bradley 
|
|align=center|3
|align=center|5:00
|Moscow, Russia
|
|-
|Loss
|align=center| 23–7 (2)
|Yushin Okami
|Decision (split)
|WSOF 34
|
|align=center|3
|align=center|5:00
|New York City, New York, United States
|
|-
| Win
| align=center| 23–6 (2)
| Chris Honeycutt
|TKO (punches)
| Bellator 148
| 
| align=center| 1
| align=center| 0:40
| Fresno, California, United States
| 
|-
| NC
| align=center| 22–6 (2)
| Chris Honeycutt
| NC (accidental headbutt)
| Bellator 140
| 
| align=center| 2
| align=center| 2:47
| Uncasville, Connecticut, United States
| 
|-
| Win
| align=center| 22–6 (1)
| Josh Neer
| Decision (unanimous)
| Bellator 129
| 
| align=center| 3
| align=center| 5:00
| Council Bluffs, Iowa, United States
| 
|-
| Loss
| align=center| 21–6 (1)
| Nathan Coy
| Decision (unanimous)
| Bellator 112
| 
| align=center| 3
| align=center| 5:00
| Hammond, Indiana, United States
| Bellator Season 10 Welterweight Tournament Quarterfinal
|-
| Win 
| align=center| 21–5 (1)
| Karl Amoussou
| Decision (unanimous)
| Bellator 104
| 
| align=center| 3
| align=center| 5:00
| Cedar Rapids, Iowa, United States
| 
|-
| Loss
| align=center| 20–5 (1)
| Valdir Araújo
| Decision (split)
| CFA 8: Araújo vs. Bradley
| 
| align=center| 3
| align=center| 5:00
| Coral Gables, Florida, United States
| 
|-
| Win
| align=center| 20–4 (1)
| Keith Smetana
| TKO (punches)
| Downtown Showdown 6
| 
| align=center| 2
| align=center| 2:37
| Minneapolis, Minnesota, United States
| 
|-
| Win
| align=center| 19–4 (1)
| Ryan Braun
| Submission (arm-triangle choke)
| Downtown Showdown 4
| 
| align=center| 2
| align=center| 2:11
| Minneapolis, Minnesota, United States
| 
|-
| Loss
| align=center| 18–4 (1)
| Mike Pierce
| Decision (split)
| UFC on Fox: Velasquez vs. dos Santos
| 
| align=center| 3
| align=center| 5:00
| Anaheim, California, United States
| Welterweight bout
|-
| Loss
| align=center| 18–3 (1)
| Rafael Natal
| Decision (unanimous)
| UFC 133
| 
| align=center| 3
| align=center| 5:00
| Philadelphia, Pennsylvania, United States
| Middleweight bout
|-
| Win
| align=center| 18–2 (1)
| Eddie Larrea
| Submission (arm-triangle choke)
| Extreme Challenge 188
| 
| align=center| 1
| align=center| 2:54
| Minneapolis, Minnesota, United States
| 
|-
| Win
| align=center| 17–2 (1)
| Kenneth Allen
| Submission (guillotine choke)
| Extreme Challenge 183
| 
| align=center| 1
| align=center| 0:45
| Black River Falls, Wisconsin, United States
| 
|-
| Win
| align=center| 16–2 (1)
| Anton Tomash
| TKO (punches)
| Meskwaki Mayhem
| 
| align=center| 1
| align=center| 1:27
| Tama, Iowa, United States
| 
|-
| Win
| align=center| 15–2 (1)
| Ted Worthington
| Submission (neck crank)
| CFX: Extreme Challenge on Target
| 
| align=center| 3
| align=center| 2:31
| Minneapolis, Minnesota, United States
| 
|-
| Win
| align=center| 14–2 (1)
| Johnny Rees
| Submission (rear-naked choke)
| Shark Fights 13: Jardine vs Prangley
| 
| align=center| 1
| align=center| 4:28
| Amarillo, Texas, United States
| 
|-
| NC
| align=center| 13–2 (1)
| Sam Alvey
| No contest (rainfall)
| KOTC: Chain Reaction
| 
| align=center| N/A
| align=center| N/A
| Lac du Flambeau, Wisconsin, United States
| 
|-
| Loss
| align=center| 13–2
| Luke Rockhold
| TKO (knees to the body)
| Strikeforce Challengers: Kaufman vs. Hashi
| 
| align=center| 1
| align=center| 2:24
| San Jose, California, United States
| 
|-
| Win
| align=center| 13–1
| Levi Avera
| Decision (unanimous)
| Strikeforce Challengers: Kennedy vs. Cummings
| 
| align=center| 3
| align=center| 5:00
| Tulsa, Oklahoma, United States
| 176 lb Catchweight bout
|-
| Win
| align=center| 12–1
| Leonardo Pecanha
| Decision (unanimous)
| UCFC: Rumble on the Rivers
| 
| align=center| 3
| align=center| 5:00
| Pittsburgh, Pennsylvania, United States
| 
|-
| Loss
| align=center| 11–1
| Mike Pierce
| Decision (unanimous)
| RIE 2: Brotherly Love Brawl
| 
| align=center| 3
| align=center| 5:00
| Oaks, Pennsylvania, United States
| 
|-
| Win
| align=center| 11–0
| Nathan Coy
| Decision (split)
| WCA: Pure Combat
| 
| align=center| 3
| align=center| 5:00
| Atlantic City, New Jersey, United States
| 
|-
| Win
| align=center| 10–0
| Dante Rivera
| TKO (punches)
| Ring of Combat 22
| 
| align=center| 1
| align=center| 0:34
| Atlantic City, New Jersey, United States
| Won ROC Middleweight Championship
|-
| Win
| align=center| 9–0
| Patrick Horner
| Decision (unanimous)
| NAAFS: Caged Fury 5
| 
| align=center| 3
| align=center| 5:00
| Cleveland, Ohio, United States
| 
|-
| Win
| align=center| 8–0
| De'marco Harris
| Decision (unanimous)
| Evening in the Cage 2
| 
| align=center| 3
| align=center| 5:00
| Fort Walton Beach, Florida, United States
| 
|-
| Win
| align=center| 7–0
| D.J. Watkins
| TKO (punches)
| Destiny Fight 1
| 
| align=center| 1
| align=center| 2:27
| Fort Walton Beach, Florida, United States
| 
|-
| Win
| align=center| 6–0
| Mike van Meer
| TKO (punches)
| Masters of the Cage 16
| 
| align=center| 3
| align=center| 3:58
| Oklahoma City, Oklahoma, United States
| 
|-
| Win
| align=center| 5–0
| Ryan Braun
| Submission (rear-naked choke)
| Title Fighting Championships
| 
| align=center| 1
| align=center| 0:56
| Des Moines, Iowa, United States
| 
|-
| Win
| align=center| 4–0
| Troy King
| Decision (majority)
| LOF 15: Vengeance
| 
| align=center| 3
| align=center| 5:00
| Indianapolis, Indiana, United States
| 
|-
| Win
| align=center| 3–0
| Joe Neace
| TKO (punches)
| LOF Revolution 4
| 
| align=center| 1
| align=center| 2:01
| Plainfield, Indiana, United States
| 
|-
| Win
| align=center| 2–0
| Adam Stoup
| TKO (corner stoppage)
| LOF 12: Black Tie Battles
| 
| align=center| 2
| align=center| 5:00
| Indianapolis, Indiana, United States
| 
|-
| Win
| align=center| 1–0
| James Powell
| Submission (guillotine choke)
| LOF: Fright Night
| 
| align=center| 1
| align=center| N/A
| Indianapolis, Indiana, United States
|

See also
 List of Bellator MMA alumni

References

External links
 
 

1983 births
Living people
American male sport wrestlers
Amateur wrestlers
People from Tama, Iowa
American male mixed martial artists
Mixed martial artists from Iowa
Welterweight mixed martial artists
Mixed martial artists utilizing collegiate wrestling
Mixed martial artists utilizing freestyle wrestling
Ultimate Fighting Championship male fighters